Attention is the mental process involved in attending to other objects.

Attention may also refer to:

Psychology and neuroscience
 Attention seeking, behavior which is intended to attract attention from others
 Attention span, the amount of time a person can concentrate on a single activity
 Selective attention, the process by which only a subset of stimuli received by our sensory organs are selected to enter the consciousness
 Attentional bias, a type of cognitive bias
 Attention deficit hyperactivity disorder, a developmental disorder
 Adult attention-deficit disorder,  attention-deficit hyperactivity disorder present in adulthood
 Continuous partial attention, constantly paying attention to different things, but only partially
 Inattentional blindness, the phenomenon of not being able to see things (as of a cognitive filtering process) that are actually there

Computing
 Attention management, models and tools for supporting the management of attention at the individual or at the collective level
 Secure attention key, a key combination entered before a login screen is presented
 Principles of attention stress, a user interface design theory
 Attention Profiling Mark-up Language, an XML-based format for capturing a person's interests and dislikes
 Attention (machine learning), a machine learning technique that mimics natural attention in organisms

Economy and management
 Attention (advertising), the measure of an advertisement's ability to win the audience's attention
 Attention economy, an approach to the management of information that treats human attention as a scarce commodity

Music
 Attention (band), an American rock band
 AttenCHUN!, a 2003 album by BoneCrusher
 Attention (GusGus album), 2002
 Attention (Philmont album), 2009
 Attention!, a 2006 album by Alexander Klaws
 Attention: Miley Live, a 2022 live album by Miley Cyrus
 "Attention", the title song
 "Attention" (bugle call)
 "Attention" (Ulrikke Brandstorp song), 2020
 "Attention" (Fat Joe song), 2018
 "Attention" (Vilija Matačiūnaitė song), 2014
 "Attention" (Charlie Puth song), 2017
 "Attention" (Omah Lay and Justin Bieber song), 2022
 "Attention" (NewJeans song), 2022
 "Attention", by James from Girl at the End of the World (2016)
 "Attention", by Ringo Starr from Stop and Smell the Roses (1981)
 "Attention", by Tiwa Savage from Celia (2020)
 "Attention", by Tokio Hotel from Humanoid (2009)
 "Attention", by Todrick Hall from Haus Party, Pt. 1 (2019)
 "Attention", by The Weeknd from Starboy (2016)

Other uses
 Sati (Buddhism), a Buddhist conception of attention
 At attention, the military courtesy of standing erect when ordered to
 Eight Points of Attention, a military doctrine that was issued in 1928 by Mao Zedong
 Attention (film), a 1946 Bollywood film

See also 
 Meditation
 Philosophy